Maintal West station is a railway station in the municipality of Maintal, located in the Main-Kinzig-Kreis in Hesse, Germany.

References

Railway stations in Hesse
Buildings and structures in Main-Kinzig-Kreis